The molecular formula C4F8 (molar mass: 200.03 g/mol, exact mass: 199.9872 u) may refer to:

 Octafluorocyclobutane, or perfluorocyclobutane
 Perfluoroisobutene (PFIB)

Molecular formulas